Orybina flaviplaga is a moth of the family Pyralidae described by Francis Walker in 1863. It is found in China, India, Thailand and Taiwan.

The wingspan is 39–42 mm. Adults are on wing in May.

References

Moths described in 1863
Pyralinae